The 2022 Triglav osiguranje Radivoj Korać Cup was the 20th season of the Serbian men's national basketball cup tournament. The tournament was held in Niš from 17–20 February 2022.

Crvena zvezda mts successfully defended their title. Borac Zemun made their debut at the national cup tournament.

Qualified teams
Source

L The league table position after 15 rounds played

Personnel and sponsorship

Venue
On 23 December 2021, it was announced that the tournament will be held in Niš. It is the 12th time in total and first time after two years that will be held in Niš.

Draw 
The draw was conducted on Monday 31 January 2022 at the Arena Sport live show. It was held by Serbia national team head coaches Marina Maljković and Svetislav Pešić, the Mayor of Niš Dragana Sotirovski, and the Triglav Serbia CEO Dragan Marković.

1 The lowest ABA League position after 13 rounds played

Bracket

Quarterfinals
All times are local UTC+1.

Crvena zvezda mts v Radnički Kragujevac

Mega Mozzart v Zlatibor

FMP Meridian v Borac Čačak

Partizan NIS v Borac Zemun

Semifinals

Crvena zvezda mts v Mega Mozzart

It was the 300th win for Montenegrin head coach Dejan Radonjić on the Crvena zvezda bench.

Partizan NIS v FMP Meridian

Final

The defending champion Crvena zvezda has current 5-in-a-row sequence in the Radivoj Korać Cup Final, as well as the eight match overall facing eternal rival Partizan. Partizan won five times in the Final including the last three, while Crvena zvezda won two times.

See also
2021–22 Basketball League of Serbia
2021–22 KK Crvena zvezda season
2021–22 KK Partizan season
2021–22 Milan Ciga Vasojević Cup

References

External links
 

Radivoj Korać Cup
Radivoj
Radivoj Korać Cup